Dave Stachelski (born March 1, 1977) is a former American football tight end who played for the New Orleans Saints of the National Football League (NFL). He was drafted in the fifth round of the 2000 NFL Draft. He played college football at Boise State University.

References 

1977 births
Living people
American football tight ends
Boise State Broncos football players
New Orleans Saints players